Doiran Lake  (Dojransko Ezero; , Límni Dhoïráni), also spelled Dojran Lake is a lake with an area of  shared between North Macedonia and Greece.

To the west is the city of Nov Dojran (Нов Дојран), to the east the village of Mouries, to the north the mountain Belasica/Beles and to the south the Greek town of Doirani.

History
The lake was on the southern line of the Macedonian front during World War I, and its southern shore became the site of the various battles between allied troops and Bulgarian troops in 1916, 1917 and 1918. A monument to one of the battles and two cemeteries for Greek and British troops stand on a hill a few hundred metres south of the lake. It was designed by Sir Robert Lorimer.

Ecology
The lake is shallow and eutrophic, with extensive Phragmites reedbeds. Due to the overuse of the lake's water for agricultural purposes, Doiran's water nearly drained out, but the disaster was avoided after both countries took measures to replenish and sustain  water levels. Frequent and heavy rainfall in later years helped restore water levels in the lake.

Important Bird Areas
North Macedonia's part of the lake has been designated an Important Bird Area (IBA) by BirdLife International because it supports populations of ferruginous ducks, Dalmatian pelicans and pygmy cormorants. Greece's part of the lake is a separate but corresponding IBA.

References

External links
Commonwealth War Graves Commission article on The Doiran Memorial

Lakes of North Macedonia
Lakes of Greece
Shrunken lakes
Greece–North Macedonia border
International lakes of Europe
Ramsar sites in North Macedonia
Kilkis
Landforms of Central Macedonia
Landforms of Kilkis (regional unit)
Dojran Municipality
Important Bird Areas of Greece
Important Bird Areas of North Macedonia